Mohammed Al-Shoraimi (born 21 February 1995) is a Saudi Arabian professional footballer who plays as a defender for Al-Arabi.

Career
Al-Shoraimi started his career at the youth team of Al-Fara'a in Al-H̨arīq. On 3 July 2013, he joined the youth team of Al-Hilal. Al-Shoraimi left Al-Hilal and joined Pro League side Al-Raed on June 15, 2017. He renewed his contract with Al-Raed on July 14, 2019. On 8 October 2020, Al-Shoraimi was released by Al-Raed. On 10 October 2020, Al-Shoraimi joined newly-promoted side Al-Ain on a two-year deal. On 13 July 2022, Al-Shoraimi joined Al-Arabi.

Career statistics

Club

References

External links 
 

1995 births
Living people
People from Riyadh Province
Saudi Arabian footballers
Al-Faraa FC players
Al Hilal SFC players
Al-Raed FC players
Al-Ain FC (Saudi Arabia) players
Al-Arabi SC (Saudi Arabia) players
Saudi Professional League players
Saudi First Division League players
Association football defenders